Chongsheng Temple, (also known as SanTa Si or Tianlong Si), is a Buddhist temple near the  old town of Dali in Yunnan province, southern China. The Three Pagodas are part of the complex.

It was once the royal temple of the Kingdom of Dali, originally built in the 9th century. At its height, the temple included 891 rooms, 11,400 Buddhist iconographies, three pavilions, and seven buildings. The temple was severely damaged by earthquakes and conflict during the rule of the Qing Dynasty, but was later rebuilt in 2005.

See also 

 List of Buddhist temples
 Architecture of the Song dynasty

References

External links 

 Three Pagodas and Chongshen Temple at China Discovery

Buddhist monasteries in Yunnan
Tibetan Buddhist monasteries
Ming dynasty architecture
9th-century Buddhist temples
9th-century establishments in China
Buildings and structures in Dali Bai Autonomous Prefecture